Maynard T. Parker (October 30, 1850 – June 25, 1915) was an American jurist, newspaper editor, and politician.

Born in Roxbury, New Hampshire, Parker moved to Racine, Wisconsin, with his parents in 1854. He then moved with his parents to Ahnapee, Kewaunee County, Wisconsin, in 1855. Parker was one of the editors and owners of the Ahnapee Record newspaper. He went to Ripon College and was admitted to the Wisconsin bar in 1879. Parker practiced law in Algoma, Wisconsin. He served as Algoma village and city clerk. Parker also served as mayor of Algoma. Parker served as Algoma city attorney and Kewaunee County district attorney. In 1897, Parker served in the Wisconsin State Assembly and was a Republican. Parker then served as Kewaunee County judge until his death. He died at his home in Algoma.

Notes

1850 births
1915 deaths
People from Roxbury, New Hampshire
People from Ahnapee, Wisconsin
Ripon College (Wisconsin) alumni
Editors of Wisconsin newspapers
Wisconsin lawyers
Mayors of places in Wisconsin
Wisconsin state court judges
People from Algoma, Wisconsin
19th-century American judges
19th-century American lawyers
Republican Party members of the Wisconsin State Assembly